Marjorie Deanne (January 28, 1917May 21, 1994) was an American film actress. She appeared in over 25 films between 1938 and 1943.

Born Clara Pauline Boughton, modern viewers will recognize Deanne for her appearances in several Three Stooges films such as Violent Is the Word for Curly, Dutiful But Dumb and Matri-Phony.

Deanne died in Redwood City, California in 1994.

External links

  The Three Stooges Online Filmography at threestooges.net

1917 births
1994 deaths
American film actresses
20th-century American actresses